Ferdinand Masset (November 23, 1920 – March 31, 2014) was a Swiss politician of the Free Democratic Party of Switzerland. He was a member of the State Council of the Canton of Fribourg. He was born in Courtion.

Masset died in Fribourg from natural causes, aged 93.

References

1920 births
2014 deaths
Swiss politicians
Swiss civil servants
People from the canton of Fribourg